The Metropolexpress, abbreviated MEX, is a train type introduced in June 2021 for local rail passenger transport in Baden-Württemberg.

Concept
The aim of the concept is to serve the main lines in the Stuttgart Metropolitan Region between Stuttgart Hauptbahnhof and the surrounding rural and urban districts outside the Stuttgart S-Bahn area at a dense frequency. This is to be done on weekdays between 5 AM and 0 AM every 30 minutes. In addition, an hourly night service will be introduced on weekends between 0 AM and 5AM. As in the case of the former Stadt-Express, MEX trains will stop at all stations outside the S-Bahn area, but only at important interchanges with the S-Bahn and city services.

Lines and history
On behalf of the responsible Public Transport Authority, the Nahverkehrsgesellschaft Baden-Württemberg (NVBW), the following connections are offered, all of which are linked in Stuttgart:

Within the core area designated as MEX routes, trains run every half hour. On the Stuttgart-Murrhardt section, the half-hourly interval is created by overlapping the hourly MEX 19, the two-hourly MEX 90 and the two-hourly RE 90 (Stuttgart-Nürnberg). On the Tübingen-Heilbronn section, the half-hourly interval is created by overlapping the hourly MEX 12 and the hourly MEX 18.

Before the renaming to MEX, the lines, with the exception of MEX 14, were for the most part already served by Regionalbahn (RB) or Regional-Express (RE) trains every half hour under the same or similar line number. In order not to break existing lines, lines that partly also run outside the Metropolexpress core area are also called MEX there, although they run there at thinner intervals.

In the context of the Reactivation of the Black Forest Railway, a Metropolexpress between Stuttgart and Calw is also under discussion, but its implementation is not included in the concept of the Ministry of Transport Baden-Württemberg.

As part of the negotiations between the federal state and the Schwarzwald-Baar-Kreis, in addition to the electrification of the Ringzug network, the establishment of a Metropolexpress Villingen-Stuttgart connection via the previously non-electrified Rottweil-Villingen railway was agreed.

References

Passenger rail transport in Germany
Regional rail in Germany